Shevington is a civil parish in the Metropolitan Borough of Wigan, Greater Manchester, England.  The parish contains eight listed buildings that are recorded in the National Heritage List for England.  All the listed buildings are designated at Grade II, the lowest of the three grades, which is applied to "buildings of national importance and special interest".  The parish contains the villages of Shevington and Gathurst and the surrounding countryside.  The Leeds and Liverpool Canal passes through the parish, and the listed buildings associated with it are a bridge, locks, and a lock-keeper's cottage.  The other listed buildings are a farmhouse, farm buildings, a public house with a mounting block, and a school and master's house.


Buildings

References

Citations

Sources

Lists of listed buildings in Greater Manchester